9912 Donizetti, provisional designation , is a stony Rafita asteroid from the central regions of the asteroid belt, approximately 7 kilometers in diameter. It was discovered during the third Palomar–Leiden Trojan survey in 1977, and named after Italian composer Gaetano Donizetti.

Discovery 

Donizetti was discovered on 16 October 1977, by the Dutch astronomers Ingrid and Cornelis van Houten, on photographic plates taken by Dutch–American astronomer Tom Gehrels at Palomar Observatory in California, United States.

Trojan survey 

The survey designation "T-3" stands for the third and last Palomar–Leiden Trojan survey, named after the fruitful collaboration of the Palomar and Leiden Observatory in the 1960s and 1970s. Gehrels used Palomar's Samuel Oschin telescope (also known as the 48-inch Schmidt Telescope), and shipped the photographic plates to Ingrid and Cornelis van Houten at Leiden Observatory where astrometry was carried out. The trio are credited with the discovery of several thousand asteroids.

Orbit and classification 

It orbits the Sun in the central main-belt at a distance of 2.2–2.9 AU once every 4 years and 1 month (1,499 days). Its orbit has an eccentricity of 0.15 and an inclination of 7° with respect to the ecliptic.

The body's observation arc begins at the discovering Palomar Observatory on 7 October 1977, just 9 days prior to its official discovery observation.

Rafita family 

Donizetti is a stony member of the Rafita family, which is located in the central main-belt just beyond the 3:1 mean-motion orbital resonance with Jupiter. The family consists of more than a thousand members, the largest being 1658 Innes and 1587 Kahrstedt, approximately 14 and 15 kilometers in diameter, respectively. The family's namesake, 1644 Rafita, is considered an interloper to the family itself.

Physical characteristics 

Donizetti has been characterized as a stony S-type asteroid by Pan-STARRS photometric survey.

Rotation period 

In October 2010, a rotational lightcurve of Donizetti was obtained from photometric observations in the R-band at the Palomar Transient Factory (PTF) in California. Lightcurve analysis gave a rotation period of 6.228 hours with a brightness variation of 0.19 magnitude.

In December 2011, PTF obtained a second lightcurve, also in the R-band, that gave a concurring period of 6.230 hours and a higher amplitude of 0.32 magnitude.().

Diameter and albedo 

According to the surveys carried out by the NEOWISE mission of NASA's Wide-field Infrared Survey Explorer, Donizetti measures 6.922 kilometers in diameter and its surface has an albedo of 0.255.

The Collaborative Asteroid Lightcurve Link assumes a standard albedo for stony asteroids of 0.20 and calculates a diameter of 6.54 kilometers based on an absolute magnitude of 13.29.

Naming 

This minor planet was named for Italian composer of symphonies, church and chamber music and operas, Gaetano Donizetti (1797–1848). The approved naming citation was published by the Minor Planet Center on 2 April 1999.

References

External links 
 Asteroid Lightcurve Database (LCDB), query form (info )
 Dictionary of Minor Planet Names, Google books
 Asteroids and comets rotation curves, CdR – Observatoire de Genève, Raoul Behrend
 Discovery Circumstances: Numbered Minor Planets (5001)-(10000) – Minor Planet Center
 
 

009912
Discoveries by Cornelis Johannes van Houten
Discoveries by Ingrid van Houten-Groeneveld
Discoveries by Tom Gehrels
2078
Named minor planets
009912
19771016
Gaetano Donizetti